Vivek Oberoi (born Vivek Anand Oberoi; 3 September 1976) is an Indian actor who predominantly appears in Hindi films. He made his film debut with Ram Gopal Varma's Company (2002) which was a superhit at the box office and he won Filmfare Best Debut, Filmfare Best Supporting Actor and Filmfare Best Actor.

His next release was Saathiya (2002) which too was a  superhit at the box office and he won Filmfare Best Actor and Superstar of Tomorrow-Male at Stardust Awards. But many of his films flopped at the box office and created a setback in his film career. But then his performance got noted in films like Yuva (2004) and Omkara (2006) and won Best Supporting Actor for the former and for the latter he won Best Supporting Actor  at Bollywood Movie Awards.
His Performance in negative roles got noticed at Shootout at Lokhandwala (2007) and Lucifer (2019) and for the former he won Star Screen Award Best Villain and for the latter
he won Best Actor at Negative Role 7th South Indian International Movie Awards, Asianet Film Awards and Vanitha Film Awards.

Films

Other Language Films

Television

Music video

Dubbing

References

Indian filmographies
Male actor filmographies